St. Targmanchats Monastery was an Armenian monastery located in Nürgüt village (Ordubad district) of the Nakhchivan Autonomous Republic of Azerbaijan. It was located in the central part of the village.

History 
The monastery was founded in 1662.

Architectural characteristics 
The church of the monastery was a basilica with a nave, two aisles, an apse and two vestries.

Destruction 
The church was still standing in the 1980s and was destroyed at some point by June 15, 2006, as documented by the Caucasus Heritage Watch.

References 

Armenian churches in Azerbaijan
Ruins in Azerbaijan